Kjell Oscarius (born 1 May 1943 in Stockholm) is a Swedish curler and World Champion.

In 1973 he was inducted into the Swedish Curling Hall of Fame.

Personal life
Kjell's younger brother Bengt is also a curler and teammate.

References

External links
 

 

Living people
1943 births
Swedish male curlers
World curling champions
Swedish curling champions
Sportspeople from Stockholm